Tristan-Samuel Weissborn (born 24 October 1991) is an Austrian tennis player.

Weissborn has a career high ATP singles ranking of 503 achieved on 22 July 2013. He also has a career high ATP doubles ranking of 77 achieved on 1 May 2017.

Weissborn won his first ATP Challenger title at the 2015 Sparkassen ATP Challenger, partnering Maximilian Neuchrist.

Weissborn made his ATP World Tour doubles debut at the 2016 Swiss Open Gstaad, where he reached with partner Sander Arends the semifinals.

ATP career finals

Doubles: 1 (1 runner-up)

Challenger and Futures finals

Singles: 2 (1–1)

Doubles: 74 (42–32)

Doubles performance timeline

External links
 
 

1991 births
Living people
Austrian male tennis players
Tennis players from Vienna
People from Korneuburg
Sportspeople from Lower Austria